KCOL (600 kHz) is a commercial AM radio station licensed to Wellington, Colorado, and serving the Fort Collins-Greeley radio market.  The station airs a news/talk format and is owned by iHeartMedia, Inc.  The studios and offices are on Byrd Drive in Loveland, while the transmitter is off North County Road 13 in Fort Collins.

Weekdays begin with a local news and information show, Mornings with Jimmy Lakey.  The rest of the weekday schedule is made up of syndicated talk shows, including Rush Limbaugh, Sean Hannity, Glenn Beck, Mark Levin, Clyde Lewis, Coast to Coast AM with George Noory and This Morning, America's First News with Gordon Deal.  Weekends feature shows on health, money, religion, home repair and technology, some of which are paid brokered programming.  Weekend hosts include Gary Sullivan, Leo Laporte, Joe Pags and Bill Cunningham.  Most hours begin with Fox News Radio.

History
On January 12, 1959, the station signed on as KZIX, originally licensed to Fort Collins.  It was a 1,000 watt daytimer, required to go off the air at sunset to protect KOGO San Diego.

In August 1965, KZIX was acquired by Poudre Valley Broadcasting.  The following month, it signed on an FM station, 93.3 KFMF (now KTCL Wheat Ridge).  In the 1970s, KZIX broadcast a country music format.  It switched its call sign to KIIX.  In the 1980s, it increased its power to 5,000 watts and added nighttime service at 500 watts, while also changing its city of license to Wellington, just north of Fort Collins.  It continued to air country music in the daytime but also added syndicated talk shows at night from NBC Talknet.

In 1998, Clear Channel Communications, a forerunner of current owner iHeartMedia, paid $6.1 million to acquire KIIX and alternative rock KTCL.  KIIX's format switched to soft oldies and adult standards.  On November 5, 1999, Clear Channel flipped the call letters of two of its Fort Collins-area stations. AM 600 KIIX became KCOL.  Meanwhile, the station at AM 1410 that had been KCOL now was called KIIX.  KCOL switched to its current talk format, while KIIX began broadcasting a sports radio format.

References

External links
Newstalk 600 KCOL Facebook
KCOL

COL
News and talk radio stations in the United States
Radio stations established in 1999
IHeartMedia radio stations
1999 establishments in Colorado